The Holocaust History Project (THHP) is an inactive non-profit corporation based in San Antonio, Texas. Its archived website offers a comprehensive selection of documents, recordings, photographs, and essays regarding the Holocaust, Holocaust denial, and antisemitism. The project became known for its refutations of the Leuchter report and the Rudolf report. It has since assisted in the defense in the case of Irving v. Lipstadt. As of 2016 THHP website is no longer available online although its entire content is accessible via several hundred captures in the Internet Archives. However starting April 2016 the French NGO and project phdn.org has put back online an almost complete copy of the original THHP website.

THHP defines itself an organization of "concerned individuals working together to educate and inform about the Holocaust." Some of the members remain anonymous. The founding director was Harry W. Mazal, OBE, who died in 2011.

Among the material presented, there are essays about scientific and legal analyses, events and people, expert witness testimony, original Nazi documents, transcripts of many of the Nuremberg trials, and the complete texts of two influential works, Jean-Claude Pressac's Auschwitz: Technique and Operation of the Gas Chambers and Robert Jay Lifton's The Nazi Doctors. There are also extensive sections on the Auschwitz and Operation Reinhard extermination camps.

More than 20 "short essays" address a variety of questions of interest, including an extensive bibliography of Holocaust related topics.  There is also a section devoted to Holocaust denial, including direct debunking of deniers such as David Irving, Ernst Zündel, and several others.

Members
 Mikkel Andersson, information technology consultant
 Yale F. Edeiken, attorney
 Richard J. Green, Ph.D., physical chemist
 Patrick J. Groff, computer scientist
 Ralf Loserth, computer scientist
 Andrew E. Mathis, Ph.D., adjunct professor of humanities (including Holocaust), University of the Sciences
 Harry W. Mazal, chemist
 Jamie McCarthy, computer scientist
 Gord McFee, historian and scholar of German history and literature
 Danny Mittleman, associate professor of information systems, DePaul University
 Sara Salzman, marketing consultant
 Nicholas Terry, Ph.D., lecturer in history, University of Exeter
 John Zimmerman, associate professor of accounting, business and economics, University of Nevada Las Vegas

References

External links
 Homepage stored by Wayback
 Online copy of the original THHP website on phdn.org

Holocaust historiography